Fritz Ganster (born 4 September 1960) is an Austrian ice hockey player. He competed in the men's tournament at the 1984 Winter Olympics.

References

External links
 

1960 births
Living people
Austrian ice hockey players
Olympic ice hockey players of Austria
Ice hockey players at the 1984 Winter Olympics
People from Zeltweg
Sportspeople from Styria
20th-century Austrian people